Reza Ma'ghouli (born September 23, 1984) is an Iranian footballer who plays for Naft Tehran in the Iran's Premier Football League.

Club career
Ma'ghouli joined Esteghlal Ahvaz F.C. in 2009.

Club career statistics

References

1984 births
Living people
Esteghlal Ahvaz players
Rah Ahan players
Iranian footballers
Niroye Zamini players
Foolad FC players
Naft Tehran F.C. players
Association football midfielders
People from Karaj
21st-century Iranian people